The Museo Nazionale Alinari della Fotografia (MNAF - National Museum Alinari of Photography), formerly Museo della Storia della Fotografia Fratelli Alinari is a photography museum located in part of the premises of the former Ospedale di San Paolo in the Piazza Santa Maria Novella in Florence, region of Tuscany, Italy). It hosts special exhibitions on a regular basis and possesses 350.000 vintage prints from the 19th and 20th centuries. The museum closed in 2012.

Since 1 November 2006 it is located in the Ospedale di San Paolo, a former pilgrims' hostel that was later transformed into a school. Before that, the museum was in the Palazzo Rucellai and in the premises of the Fratelli Alinari. It was the first museum of Italy to be devoted exclusively to photography.

The collection is continuously expanded with acquisitions and donations and contains works by, among others:
 Robert Anderson
 Vincenzo Balocchi
 Carlo Baravalle
 Felice Beato
 Alphonse Bernoud
 Samuel Bourne
 Bill Brandt
 Roger Fenton
 Frédéric Flacheron
 Wilhelm von Gloeden
 Paul Graham
 Robert Macpherson
 Carlo Mollino
 Luciano Morpurgo
 Carlo Naya
 Mario Nunes Vais
 Domenico Riccardo Peretti Griva
 Giuseppe Primoli
 Roberto Rive
 James Robertson
 Giorgio Sommer
 Giuseppe Wulz

The museum exhibits also thousands of photo albums, cameras, objectives and other objects connected with the history of photography.

Bibliography 
 Amedeo Benedetti, "I Fratelli Alinari", in Gli archivi delle immagini, Genova, Erga, 2000, pp. 348–358.

External links 
 The Alinari Museum

Museums in Florence
National museums of Italy
Photography museums and galleries in Italy
Photographic technology museums